The Araneta City Bus Port (ACBP), also styled Araneta City Busport, is a bus station in Quezon City, Metro Manila, the Philippines. The bus station is currently one of two bus terminals in the Araneta City business district that link Metro Manila with the provinces in the north and south of the country, including cities in the Visayas and Mindanao via the Philippine Nautical Highway System. Built and completed in 2017 as the modern alternative to, and eventual replacement for, the adjacent Araneta City Bus Terminal, the oldest integrated bus terminal in Metro Manila, in operation since 1993, and is also a hub for buses servicing the Bicol Region. The busport is used by 9 (formerly 19) inter-city and provincial bus lines, including DLTBCo, Ceres Transport and Philtranco. The terminal is connected to the LRT Line 2 and MRT Line 3 by a network of elevated walkways and mall connections.

Location 

The Araneta City Bus Port is located along General Romulo Avenue on the eastern side of Araneta City within the barangay of Socorro, Quezon City. The bus station is situated in the district of Cubao, a densely populated area north of Ortigas Center in east-central Metro Manila that has the highest density of bus terminals in the entire Manila metropolitan area. It is directly across from Ali Mall and one block from the old Araneta bus station on Times Square Avenue.

History 

The Araneta busport sits on the original location of Metro Manila's first integrated terminal which opened in 1993. In 2011, the Araneta Center Bus Station was relocated to the old Rustan's building located on Times Square Avenue built in 1974, after the department store transferred to its new home at the newly opened Gateway Mall in 2005, to make way for the construction of the Manhattan Heights, a 4-tower condominium development, as part of the Manhattan Gardens complex. The old bus terminal is expected to be torn down in the future to make way for the construction of the Manhattan Plaza, the final highrise development of the Manhattan Gardens project.

The modern busport at Manhattan Heights was inaugurated as the Araneta Center Bus Port in March 2017 with Vice President Leni Robredo in attendance. Following the issuance of the Metro Manila Council regulation prohibiting the operation of all provincial bus terminals along EDSA in order to ease traffic congestion in Manila's main artery, the Metropolitan Manila Development Authority announced in May 2019 that the Araneta bus terminal shall be exempt from the ban.

In March 2020, the terminal was closed due the Covid-19 pandemic, and served as an RT-PCR COVID-19 saliva testing site, in partnership with the Philippine Red Cross, while transport services were temporarily moved to the old Araneta City Bus Station, which has 23 bays. The old bus terminal reopened in September 2020, and has limited its operations to Central Luzon, and has gradually expanded its services, while reviving previous routes within 2021 to 2022. As of 2021, the Araneta Group have no announcement for the bus port's reopening, and is currently being utilized as a parking facility.

On October 25, 2022, the Araneta Group announced that all inter-city and provincial buses will be moved out from the Araneta City Bus Station, and will relocate their operations to the Araneta Bus Port. The day after the announcement, October 26, the Araneta City Bus Port reopened its operations, and services routes within areas around Metro Manila, Bulacan, Pampanga, Tabuk, Laguna, and Batangas. Presently, the Araneta City Bus Station is used to service modern jeepneys (BEEP) to and from select destinations in Quezon City, Pasig, and the Province of Rizal, under the Transport Equipment Aggregator and Management Inc. (1-TEAM), and other various transport cooperatives.

Services 
As of November 2022, the Araneta City Bus Port services the following routes:

Provincial

Bus 
 ALPS The Bus & Gold Star Transport, Inc. – operate to and from three destinations in Batangas.
 German Espiritu Liner Inc. - operate to and from three destinations in Bulacan.
 HM Transport Inc. - operate to and from four destinations in Laguna.
 Philippine Rabbit Bus Lines, Inc. - operate to and from four destinations in Pampanga.
 R.J. Express, Inc. - operate to and from two destinations in Pampanga.
 ES Transport - operate to and from destinations in Cabanatuan and Tabuk.

Intercity

Bus 

 UBE Express operates Premium Point-to-Point Bus Service to Manila International Airport.
 Mega Manila Consortium Corporation operates bus route 2 of the rationalized bus transit passing to and from Antipolo and Quiapo respectively.

Jeep & Shuttle Services 

 Araneta City, Inc. operates electric-powered city shuttles (e-shuttles, also known as Green & Go) to destinations within the Araneta City district from Ali Mall to the LRT 2 Cubao Station Concourse. The Bus Port served as the shuttle's parking garage before reopening its services in November 2022.
 Traditional jeeps operate from the Araneta City Jeepney Terminal further north along General Romulo Avenue to Calumpang, Camp Crame, Lagro, and Project 4; outside Metro Manila including Angono, Antipolo, Silangan (San Mateo), and Taytay.

Suspended due to the COVID-19 Pandemic
The following bus companies moved out from the Araneta City Bus Station and shifted their operations within their own terminals within Cubao:
 ALPS The Bus – originally serving several destinations within Batangas, Bicol Region and Iloilo City.
 Ceres Transport – operates provincial buses to several destinations in Batangas & parts of Western Visayas, including Malay and Kalibo in Aklan, San Jose de Buenavista, Antique, Roxas, Capiz and Iloilo City.
 CUL Transport – services the routes to Sorsogon, Leyte and Southern Leyte including Sorsogon City, Tacloban, Ormoc, Baybay and Maasin.
 Diamond Bus – operates to and from select destinations in Samar.
 DLTBCo – operates provincial buses to and from the following destinations in the Bicol Region and Eastern Visayas: Legazpi, Daet, Ormoc, Borongan and Catarman.
 Elavil Bus Company – operates provincial buses to several destinations in Northern Samar.
 Philtranco – serves the terminal on its route to several destinations in the Bicol Region via its main terminal in Pasay.
 Silver Star Shuttle & Tours – operates bus services to and from Samar, Eastern Samar, Leyte and Bohol, including Calbayog, Catbalogan, Guiuan, Tacloban and Tagbilaran.
 Provincial Buses like Amihan, Belleza, Bobis Liner, Cagsawa Travel, JVH, Megabus, Raymond Transportation and RSL operate to and from several 
 Solid North Transit – runs several routes from Araneta City Bus Port to destinations in Pampanga, Tarlac, Pangasinan, and Baguio. destinations in the Bicol Region, including Masbate.

References

External links 
 Official website of Araneta City Busport

Buildings and structures in Quezon City
Bus stations in Metro Manila